The women's football tournament at the 2018 Central American and Caribbean Games was held in Barranquilla, Colombia from 19 to 30 July.

Participating teams

Squads

There are no age restrictions for the players participating in the tournament.

Group stage
Tie-breakers 

 a) greatest number of points obtained in all group matches;
 b) goal difference in all group matches;
 c) greatest number of goals scored in all group matches;

If two or more teams are equal on the basis of the above three criteria, their rankings will be determined as follows:
 d) greatest number of points obtained in the group matches between the teams concerned;
 e) goal difference resulting from the group matches between the teams concerned;
 f) greater number of goals scored in all group matches between the teams concerned;
 g) drawing of lots

All times are local (UTC−5).

Group A

Group B

Knockout stage
If necessary, extra time and penalty shoot-out are used to decide the winner.

Semi-finals

Bronze medal match

Gold medal match

Goalscorers

References

women